Critical heat flux (CHF) describes the thermal limit of a phenomenon where a phase change occurs during heating (such as bubbles forming on a metal surface used to heat water), which suddenly decreases the efficiency of heat transfer, thus causing localised overheating of the heating surface.

The critical heat flux for ignition is the lowest thermal load per unit area capable of initiating a combustion reaction on a given material (either flame or smoulder ignition).

Description
When liquid coolant undergoes a change in phase due to the absorption of heat from a heated solid surface, a higher transfer rate occurs. The more efficient heat transfer from the heated surface (in the form of heat of vaporization plus sensible heat) and the motions of the bubbles (bubble-driven turbulence and convection) leads to rapid mixing of the fluid. Therefore, boiling heat transfer has played an important role in industrial heat transfer processes such as macroscopic heat transfer exchangers in nuclear and fossil power plants, and in microscopic heat transfer devices such as heat pipes and microchannels for cooling electronic chips.

The use of boiling is limited by a condition called critical heat flux (CHF), which is also called a boiling crisis or departure from nucleate boiling (DNB). The most serious problem is that the boiling limitation can be directly related to the physical burnout of the materials of a heated surface due to the suddenly inefficient heat transfer through a vapor film formed across the surface resulting from the replacement of liquid by vapor adjacent to the heated surface.

Consequently, the occurrence of CHF is accompanied by an inordinate increase in the surface temperature for a surface-heat-flux-controlled system. Otherwise, an inordinate decrease of the heat transfer rate occurs for a surface-temperature-controlled system.  This can be explained with Newton's law of cooling:

where  represents the heat flux,  represents the heat transfer coefficient,  represents the wall temperature and  represents the fluid temperature.  If  decreases significantly due to the occurrence of the CHF condition,  will increase for fixed  and  while  will decrease for fixed .

Correlations

The critical heat flux is an important point on the boiling curve and it may be desirable to operate a boiling process near this point. However, one could become cautious of dissipating heat in excess of this amount. Zuber, through a hydrodynamic stability analysis of the problem has developed an expression to approximate this point.

 

Units: critical flux: kW/m; h: kJ/kg; σ: N/m; ρ: kg/m; g: m/s.

It is independent of the surface material and is weakly dependent upon the heated surface geometry described by the constant C. For large horizontal cylinders, spheres and large finite heated surfaces, the value of the Zuber constant .

The critical heat flux depends strongly on pressure.  At low pressures (including atmospheric pressure), the pressure dependence is mainly through the change in vapor density leading to an increase in the critical heat flux with pressure.  However, as pressures approach the critical pressure, both the surface tension and the heat of vaporization converge to zero, making them the dominant sources of pressure dependency.

For water at 1atm, the above equation calculates a critical heat flux of approximately 1000 kW/m.

Applications in heat transfer
The understanding of CHF phenomenon and an accurate prediction of the CHF condition are important for safe and economic design of many heat transfer units including nuclear reactors, fossil fuel boilers, fusion reactors, electronic chips, etc. Therefore, the phenomenon has been investigated extensively over the world since Nukiyama first characterized it.  In 1950 Kutateladze suggested the hydrodynamical theory of the burnout crisis. Much of significant work has been done during the last  decades with the development of water-cooled nuclear reactors.  Now many aspects of the phenomenon are well understood and several reliable prediction models are available for conditions of common interests.

Terminology

A number of different terms are used to denote the CHF condition: departure from nucleate boiling (DNB), liquid film dryout (LFD), annular film dryout (AFD), dryout (DO), burnout (BO), boiling crisis (BC), boiling transition (BT), etc.  DNB, LFD and AFD represent specific mechanisms which will be introduced later.

DO means the disappearance of liquid on the heat transfer surface which properly describes the CHF condition; however, it is usually used to indicate the liquid film dryout from annular flow. BO, BC and BT are phenomenon-oriented names and are used as general terms.  The CHF condition (or simply the CHF) is the most widely used today, though it may mislead one to think that there exists a criticality in the heat flux.  The terms denoting the value of heat flux at the CHF occurrence are CHF, dryout heat flux, burnout heat flux, maximum heat flux, DNB heat flux, etc.

The term peak pool boiling heat flux is also used to denote the CHF in pool boiling.

Post-CHF is used to denote the general heat transfer deterioration in flow boiling process, and liquid could be in the form of dispersed spray of droplets, continuous liquid core, or transition between the former two cases. Post-dryout can be specifically used to denote the heat transfer deterioration in the condition when liquid is only in the form of dispersed droplets, and denote the other cases by the term Post-DNB.

See also
Leidenfrost effect
Nucleate boiling

References

External links
Modeling of the boiling crisis

Thermodynamics